Barbara Weathers is the debut album by R&B singer Barbara Weathers released upon Reprise Records in 1990. The LP got to No. 18 on the UK Blues & Soul Hiplist chart.

Overview
The album was produced by Wayne Lewis, Maurice White and David Conley.

Singles
A song from the album called "The Master Key", rose to No. 13 on the US Billboard Hot R&B Singles chart. Another single entitled "Our Love Will Last Forever" reached No. 39 on the Cashbox Top R&B Singles chart.

Critical reception

The album was issued to critical acclaim. Music & Media said "Transatlantic formula funk. A
big, squeaky clean production, some decent songs and a good
voice add up to the arrival of yet another crooner. The music has none of the bite of Chaka Khan
but what it does have is a singer of charm and variety in Weathers". Phyl Garland of Stereo Review exclaimed "On the whole, a promising debut." Leonard Pitts Jr. of LA Weekly wrote "it's a solid piece of pop craftsmanship bright and spunky and then, when you least expect it moving and poignant (just don't look for deep reflection). Barbara Weathers is pop with few illusions and fewer pretensions; it serves up sunny, unobtrusive production alongside lyrics that manage the neattrick of sounding familiar without wallowing in cliche." Carl Allen of Buffalo News wrote "On her first, solo recording she demonstrates that she can produce the catchy and rhythmical pop, as in 'Barbi Doll' or romance laced ballads, as in 'Our Love Will Last Forever'". Lynn Dean Ford of the Indianapolis Star found that "Midtempo summer-flavored black pop dominates the nine-track disc". People noted that "Weathers, the former singer for Atlantic Starr, strikes out on her own with an attractive and smooth collection of adult soul music that brings to mind the apex of the S.O.S. Band." They also added "Never flashy, Weathers’s voice is graciously dignified. The whole album is like that: lively without being overwhelming, pretty without being precious. If you’re having an afternoon party in the backyard, this would be an ideal tape to slip in the boom-box."

Track listing

Covers
Weathers covered The Supremes' 1964 hit single Where Did Our Love Go on the album.

Appearances in other media
Where Did Our Love Go appeared on the soundtrack of the 2002 Emmy nominated feature film A Time for Dancing.

Charts

References

1990 debut albums
Albums produced by Maurice White
Reprise Records albums